Jason Mark Harris (born 26 December 1969) is an English former professional association footballer who played as a midfielder. He played four matches in the Football League with Burnley, making his debut in the 3–1 victory over Lincoln City on 22 November 1986.

External links
Jason Harris profile at claretsmad.co.uk

1969 births
Living people
People from Bacup
English footballers
Association football midfielders
Burnley F.C. players
English Football League players